Tringo is an online multiplayer game created by Australian developer Nathan Keir (aka Kermitt Quirk) in December 2004 that is available to play inside the virtual reality platform Second Life owned by Linden Lab.  It is described as a cross between Tetris and Bingo.

Rules
Tringo was played by a large group of players at once.  Each player is given their own "card" with a 5×5 empty grid.  The game provides a new shape every ten seconds, which the player must fit into their board. The object is to create solid square areas of 2×2, 2×3, and 3×3 squares.  When that happens, the shape is cleared from the board, and the player earns points.

Gameplay
Tringo is normally played as a gambling game, using the currency of Second Life, "Linden Dollars" (L$)  Because of the need for a large number of players, most game units are not owned privately, but are installed in casino areas and hosted by players who take the role of casino staff.  (The game unit is freely purchasable at the cost of L$15000- equivalent to roughly US$50 - but the buyer must also own game land to install it on, and be able to attract the required number of players.)

At the start of each game, the host will usually place an amount - around L$100 - in the pot, which is then won by the player who scores the highest number of points.  Players are not charged to enter but they are encouraged to add donations to the pot. In the past, the casino gained money via the Second Life "traffic" system whereby any location that attracted large numbers of people for significant periods of time was given an extra L$ award by Linden Lab. Linden Lab no longer gives payout awards for traffic.

Popularity
Some Second Life players take the view that Tringo's popularity is entirely due to its ability to offer "free money" in this way. (Second Life does not feature monster hunting or any systematic way to earn L$; they must be bought in US$, received in the stipends, or earned through doing business.)

Similar games
Tringo is similar to Jtris (a solo and multiplayer variation game), Slingo (a cross between slot machines and bingo with a similar multiplayer focus), and Blood 21 (an abstract blackjack which is also multiplayer).

Game Boy Advance
Tringo was unique as the first game developed with Second Life to be licensed for non-Second Life uses.  Donnerwood Media licensed the game and is focused on releasing it on other platforms.  The first is on the Game Boy Advance published by Crave Entertainment and developed by David A. Palmer Productions was released in late April, 2006, and there will be more platform releases in 2006.

Tringo for PC
In 2007 Australian ASX listed company Two Way Ltd. licensed Tringo globally for PC and for iTV in Asia from Donnerwood Media and now distributes the PC version of the game via its games portal Way2Play. The game is also available through other major games portals, and is promoted inside Second Life at Way2Play Island.  The PC license reverted to Donnerwood Media in late 2007, and the flash version of Tringo is now widely distributed.

See also
Second Life

References

External links
 Tringo Web - Support website for Tringo in Second Life.
 Tringo Web Game - Play Tringo For Free.
 Tringo article on CNN

Second Life
2006 video games
Game Boy Advance games
Video games developed in Australia